Jordi Vinyals Martori (born 24 November 1963 in Cardedeu, Province of Barcelona, Catalonia) is a Spanish former footballer who played as a midfielder, currently manager of Chinese Super League club Zhejiang Professional FC.

Managerial statistics

References

External links

FC Barcelona profile 

1963 births
Living people
People from Vallès Oriental
Sportspeople from the Province of Barcelona
Spanish footballers
Footballers from Catalonia
Association football midfielders
La Liga players
Segunda División players
Segunda División B players
FC Barcelona C players
FC Barcelona Atlètic players
CE Sabadell FC footballers
CD Castellón footballers
Real Oviedo players
Real Betis players
Villarreal CF players
Terrassa FC footballers
UE Figueres footballers
Spain youth international footballers
Catalonia international footballers
Spanish football managers
Segunda División managers
Segunda División B managers
Tercera División managers
Villarreal CF B managers
Palamós CF managers
Gimnàstic de Tarragona managers
Algeciras CF managers
Terrassa FC managers
Real Jaén managers
CE L'Hospitalet managers
CD Castellón managers
FC Barcelona Atlètic managers
Chinese Super League managers
China League One managers
Qingdao F.C. managers
Zhejiang Professional F.C. managers
Spanish expatriate football managers
Expatriate football managers in China
Spanish expatriate sportspeople in China